Ronan McCarthy (born 1973) is an Irish Gaelic football manager and former player. At club level he played with Douglas and was a member of and later managed the Cork senior football team. McCarthy usually lined out as a defender.

Playing career

McCarthy first came to prominence as a Gaelic footballer at juvenile and underage levels with the Douglas club. After being overlooked at schools' level for the Coláiste Chríost Rí team, he subsequently won a Sigerson Cup title in 1995 as a student at University College Cork. Two years later he won a County Intermediate Championship title with the Douglas intermediate team. McCarthy first appeared on the inter-county scene as a member of the extended panel of the Cork minor team that beat Mayo in the 1991 All-Ireland minor final. After being overlooked for the Cork under-21 team, he spent one season with the junior team before making his senior debut during the 1996-97 league. As a member of the team over the following six seasons, McCarthy won two Munster Championship medals and a National Football League title. He also lined out at right corner-back when Cork lost the 1999 All-Ireland final to Meath.

Coaching career

McCarthy's coaching career began at various levels with the Douglas club, before taking charge of the club's senior team that lost the 2008 final to Nemo Rangers. He later became involved with various Cork development squads before becoming a selector with the Cork senior football team during Conor Counihan's last season in charge in 2013. McCarthy was retained by new manager Brian Cuthbert and served as coach of the Cork senior team for a further two seasons. After taking a break from inter-county activity he managed the Carbery Rangers club to their inaugural County Championship title in 2016. McCarthy returned to the Cork senior team as a selector under Peadar Healy in 2017 before being appointed as manager at the end of that season. His four seasons in charge saw Cork reclaim and secure their National League Division 2 status, while the team also beat Kerry for the first time in eight seasons. In his final season in charge, McCarthy was found to be in breach of Covid-19 restrictions by holding an unauthorised training session on Youghal beach and was handed a 12-week suspension by the GAA's Central Hearings Committee.

Personal life

McCarthy was educated at Coláiste Chríost Rí before completing a Bachelor of Arts in Economics and French at University College Cork. He later qualified as a teacher and spent 20 years at Nagle Community School with his final two years as principal. In October 2016, McCarthy was appointed principal of Glanmire Community College.

Honours

Player

University College Cork
Sigerson Cup: 1995

Douglas
Cork Intermediate Football Championship: 1997

Cork
Munster Senior Football Championship: 1999, 2002
National Football League: 1998-99
All-Ireland Minor Football Championship: 1991
Munster Minor Football Championship: 1991

Management

Carbery Rangers
Cork Senior Football Championship: 2016

Cork
National Football League Division 3: 2020
McGrath Cup: 2014, 2018

Career statistics

References

1973 births
Living people
UCC Gaelic footballers
Douglas Gaelic footballers
Cork inter-county Gaelic footballers
Gaelic football selectors
Gaelic football managers
Heads of schools in Ireland